Gornja Sabanta is a village in the Pivara municipality in Kragujevac city district in the Šumadija District of central Serbia. 

It has a population of 839 people.

External links
Satellite map at Maplandia.com

Populated places in Šumadija District
Kragujevac